Letov can refer to:

 Letov Kbely, a Czech (and Czechoslovak) aircraft company
 Yegor Letov (1964–2008), Russian punk rock musician, leader of the band Grazhdanskaya Oborona
 Sergey Letov (born 1956), Russian saxophonist, brother of Yegor Letov